Kafka is a 1991 mystery thriller film directed by Steven Soderbergh. Ostensibly a biopic, based on the life of Franz Kafka, the film blurs the lines between fact and Kafka's fiction (most notably The Castle and The Trial), creating a Kafkaesque atmosphere. It was written by Lem Dobbs, and stars Jeremy Irons in the title role, with Theresa Russell, Ian Holm, Jeroen Krabbé, Joel Grey, Armin Mueller-Stahl, and Alec Guinness. It was partially filmed on location in Prague.

Released after Soderbergh's critically acclaimed debut Sex, Lies, and Videotape it was the first of what would be a series of low-budget box-office disappointments. It has since become a cult film, being compared to Terry Gilliam's Brazil and David Cronenberg's Naked Lunch.

Plot
Set in the city of Prague in 1919, Kafka tells the tale of an insurance clerk who gets involved with an underground group after one of his co-workers is murdered. The underground group, responsible for bombings all over town, attempts to thwart a secret organization that controls the major events in society. He eventually penetrates the secret organization in order to confront them.

Cast

Reception

Kafka was met with mixed reviews from critics. On the review aggregator website Rotten Tomatoes, the film has an approval rating of 50%, based on 24 reviews. The website's consensus reads, "Kafka does not rise to the artistic success of its subject, struggling to approximate the nightmarish absurdity that defined the author's work despite thoughtful direction by Steven Soderbergh and a gorgeous black and white color palette."

Alternate version
In a 2013 interview with Vulture, Soderbergh stated that the rights to the film had reverted to him and executive producer Paul Rassam, and that work had begun on a "completely different" version of the film.  Soderbergh reported that he and Lem Dobbs did some rewriting, inserts were shot during the making of Side Effects, and he planned to dub the film into German and release both the original and new version together. In 2020, he announced he had finished the new version, and would release it as part of a box set. The new version, titled Mr. Kneff, debuted at the 2021 Toronto International Film Festival.

References

External links 
 
  
 

1991 films
1990s science fiction films
Films set in the 1910s
Biographical films about writers
American dystopian films
Cultural depictions of Franz Kafka
Works about Franz Kafka
Films based on works by Franz Kafka
Films directed by Steven Soderbergh
Films shot at Pinewood Studios
Films shot in the Czech Republic
Films set in Prague
Films set in 1919
Films scored by Cliff Martinez
Films with screenplays by Lem Dobbs
American drama films
French drama films
Miramax films
English-language French films
Films set in Czechoslovakia
1990s English-language films
1990s American films
1990s French films